Ernő Rubik (born 13 July 1944) is a Hungarian inventor, architect, and professor of architecture. He is best known for the invention of mechanical puzzles including the Rubik's Cube (1974), Rubik's Magic, Rubik's Magic: Master Edition, and Rubik's Snake.

While Rubik became famous for inventing the Rubik's Cube and his other puzzles, much of his recent work involves the promotion of science in education. Rubik is involved with several organizations such as Beyond Rubik's Cube, the Rubik Learning Initiative and the Judit Polgar Foundation all of whose aim is to engage students in science, mathematics, and problem solving at a young age.

Ernő Rubik was born in Budapest, Hungary, on 13 July 1944, during World War II, and has lived all of his life in Hungary. His father, Ernő Rubik, was a flight engineer at the Esztergom aircraft factory, and his mother, Magdolna Szántó, was a poet. He has stated in almost every interview that he got his inspiration from his father.

His father, Ernő, was a highly respected engineer of gliders. His extensive work and expertise in this area gained him an international reputation as an expert in his field. Ernő Rubik has stated that:

Rubik studied sculpture at the Academy of Applied Arts and Design in Budapest and architecture at the Technical University, also in Budapest. While a professor of design at the academy, he pursued his hobby of building geometric models. One of these was a prototype of his cube, made of 27 wooden blocks; it took Rubik a month to solve the problem of the cube. It proved a useful tool for teaching algebraic group theory, and in late 1977 Konsumex, Hungary's state trading company, began marketing it. By 1980 Rubik's Cube was marketed throughout the world, and over 100 million authorized units, with an estimated 50 million unauthorized imitations, were sold, mostly during its subsequent three years of popularity. Approximately 50 books were published describing how to solve the puzzle of Rubik's Cube. Following his cube's popularity, Rubik opened a studio to develop designs in 1984; among its products was another popular puzzle toy, Rubik's Magic.

Education
From 1958 to 1962, Rubik specialized in sculpture at the Secondary School of Fine and Applied Arts. From 1962 to 1967, Rubik attended the Budapest University of Technology where he became a member of the Architecture Faculty. From 1967 to 1971, Rubik attended the Hungarian Academy of Applied Arts and was in the Faculty of Interior Architecture and Design.

Rubik considers university and the education it afforded him as the decisive event which shaped his life. Rubik stated, "Schools offered me the opportunity to acquire knowledge of subjects or rather crafts that need a lot of practice, persistence, and diligence with the direction of a mentor."

Career

Professorship and origin of the Rubik's Cube
From 1971 to 1979, Rubik was a professor of architecture at the Budapest College of Applied Arts (Iparművészeti Főiskola). It was during his time there that he built designs for a three-dimensional puzzle and completed the first working prototype of the Rubik's Cube in 1974, applying for a patent on the puzzle in 1975. In an interview with CNN, Rubik stated that he was "searching to find a good task for my students."

Starting with blocks of wood and rubber bands, Rubik set out to create a structure that would allow the individual pieces to move without the whole structure falling apart. Rubik originally used wood for the block because of the convenience of a workshop at the university and because he viewed wood as a simple material to work with that did not require sophisticated machinery. Rubik made the original prototypes of his cube by hand, cutting the wood, boring the holes and using elastic bands to hold the contraption together.

Rubik showed his prototype to his class and his students liked it very much. Rubik realized that, because of the cube's simple structure, it could be manufactured relatively easily and might have appeal to a larger audience. Rubik's father possessed several patents, so Rubik was familiar with the process and applied for a patent for his invention. Rubik then set out to find a manufacturer in Hungary, but had great difficulty due to the rigid planned economy of communist Hungary at the time. Eventually, Rubik was able to find a small company that worked with plastic and made chess pieces. The cube was originally known in Hungary as the Magic Cube.

Rubik licensed the Magic Cube to Ideal Toys, a US company in 1979. Ideal rebranded The Magic Cube to the Rubik's Cube before its introduction to an international audience in 1980. The process from early prototype to significant mass production of the Cube had taken over six years. The Rubik's Cube would go on to become an instant success worldwide, winning several Toy of the Year awards, and becoming a staple of 1980s popular culture. To date, over 350 million Rubik's Cubes have been sold, making it one of the best selling toys of all time. It became very famous and today, there are many sizes from 2x2 to 21x21.

Other inventions
In addition to Rubik's Cube, Rubik is also the inventor of Rubik's Magic, Rubik's Snake and Rubik's 360 among others.

Later career and other works
In the early 1980s, he became the editor of a game and puzzle journal called ..És játék (...And games), then became self-employed in 1983, founding the Rubik Stúdió, where he designed furniture and games. In 1987 he became a professor with full tenure; in 1990 he became the president of the Hungarian Engineering Academy (Magyar Mérnöki Akadémia). At the academy, he created the International Rubik Foundation to support especially talented young engineers and industrial designers.

He attended the 2007 World Championship in Budapest. He also gave a lecture and autograph session at the "Bridges-Pecs" conference ("Bridges between Mathematics and the Arts") in July 2010.

In 2009, he was appointed as an honorary professor of Keimyung University, Daegu, South Korea.

In the 2010s, Rubik has recently spent much of his time working on Beyond Rubik's Cube, a Science, Technology, Engineering, Mathematics (STEM fields) based exhibition, which would travel the globe over the next six years. The grand opening of the exhibit was held on 26 April 2014 at the Liberty Science Center in New Jersey. At the exhibition, Rubik gave several lectures, tours, and engaged with the public and several members of the speedcubing crowd in attendance, including Anthony Michael Brooks, a world-class speedcuber.

Rubik is a member of the USA Science and Engineering Festival's advisory board.

Influences
Ernő Rubik has listed several individuals who, as he has said, "exerted a great influence over me through their work." These include Leonardo da Vinci, whom Rubik regards as the Renaissance man; Michelangelo, whom he respects as a polymath, painter, and sculptor; and artist M. C. Escher, who drew impossible constructions and grappled with explorations of infinity. As regards to philosophers and writers, Rubik admires Voltaire, Stendhal, Thomas Mann, Jean-Paul Sartre, Hungarian poet Attila József, Jules Verne, and Isaac Asimov. In the field of architecture, Rubik is an admirer of Frank Lloyd Wright and Le Corbusier.

Personal life
Rubik admits to being a lifelong bibliophile and has stated, "Books offered me the possibility of gaining knowledge of the world, nature and people." Rubik has stated that he has a special interest in science fiction.

Rubik is fond of outdoor activities such as walking through nature, playing sports, and sailing on Lake Balaton. Rubik is also an avid gardener and has stated that "collecting succulents is my favourite pastime."

Prizes and awards
 1978 – Budapest International Trade Fair, Prize for the Cube
 1980 – Toy of the Year: Federal Republic of Germany, United Kingdom, France, USA
 1981 – Toy of the Year: Finland, Sweden, Italy
 1982 – Toy of the Year: United Kingdom (second time)
 1982 – The Museum of Modern Art, New York selected Rubik's Cube into its permanent collection
 1983 – Hungarian State Prize for demonstrating and teaching 3D structures and for the various solutions that inspired scientific researches in several ways
 1988 – Juvenile Prize from the State Office of Youth and Sport
 1995 – Dénes Gabor Prize from the Novofer Foundation as an acknowledgement of achievements in the field of innovation
 1996 – Ányos Jedlik Prize from the Hungarian Patent Office
 1997 – Prize for the Reputation of Hungary (1997)
 2007 – Kossuth Prize the most prestigious cultural award in Hungary
 2008 – Moholy-Nagy Prize – from the Moholy-Nagy University of Arts and Design
 2009 – EU Ambassador of the Year of Creativity and Innovation
 2010 – USA Science and Engineering Festival Award (Outstanding Contribution to Science Education)
 2010 – The Hungarian Order of Merit Commanders Cross with the Star
 2010 – Prima Primissima Prize
 2012 – My Country Awards
 2014 – Hungarian Order of Saint Stephen (The highest Hungarian state honour)
 2014 – Honorary Citizen of Budapest

Publications
Editor and co-author of A bűvös kocka ("The Magic Cube"), Műszaki Kiadó, Budapest, 1981.

Co-author of The Rubik's Cube Compendium (written by David Singmaster, Ernő Rubik, Gerzson Kéri, György Marx, Tamás Varga and Tamás Vekerdy), Oxford University Press, 1987.

Author of Cubed – The Puzzle of Us All, Flatiron Books/Orion Publishing Group /Hachette UK/Libri, 2020.

References

External links

An interview with Ernő Rubik
His biography at Hungary.hu 
His first print interview in ten years
An exclusive video interview about the new Rubik's 360

1944 births
Living people
Academic staff of the Moholy-Nagy University of Art and Design
Hungarian architects
Hungarian inventors
Recreational mathematicians
Puzzle designers
Rubik's Cube
Toy inventors